Hanna Talkanitsa (born 2 September 1987) is a former road cyclist from Belarus. She represented her nation at the 2008 UCI Road World Championships in the women's time trial and women's road race.

References

External links
 profile at Procyclingstats.com

1987 births
Belarusian female cyclists
Living people
Place of birth missing (living people)